Marjorie Claire Bishop (3 January 1910 – 26 January 1960) was a New Zealand cricketer who played as an all-rounder, batting right-handed and bowling right-arm off break. She appeared in one Test match for New Zealand, their first, in 1935, and was awarded with the first Test cap for the New Zealand women's team. She played domestic cricket for Otago.

References

External links
 
 

1910 births
1960 deaths
Cricketers from Christchurch
New Zealand women cricketers
New Zealand women Test cricketers
Otago Sparks cricketers